The 2005–2006 Turkish Cup was the 44th edition of the annual tournament that determined the association football Super League (Süper Lig) Turkish Cup champion under the auspices of the Turkish Football Federation (TFF). 
Beşiktaş J.K. beat Fenerbahçe SK 3–2 in the final at İzmir. This tournament adopted the UEFA Cup system, replacing the former standard knockout competition scheme. The results of the tournament also determined which clubs would be promoted or relegated.

First qualification round

|}
Source: Official page of 2005–06 Fortis Turkish Cup.

Second qualification round

|}
Source: Official page of 2005–06 Fortis Turkish Cup.

Group stage

Group A

Group B

Group C

Group D

Quarter-finals

|}
Source: Official page of 2005–06 Fortis Turkish Cup.

Semi-finals

|}
Source: Official page of 2005–06 Fortis Turkish Cup.

Final

References

External links
 Turkish Football Federation Official Website

2005-06
Cup
2005–06 domestic association football cups